Parliamentary elections were held in Sri Lanka on 10 October 2000.

The People's Alliance (PA) government Kumaratunga had led for six years was facing increasing criticism on two fronts: a series of military defeats at the hands of the rebel Liberation Tigers of Tamil Eelam in the country's civil war, and the faltering performance of the economy.

The elections were marred by violence.  Seventy people were killed during the campaign, including six on election day itself.  .  Both the UNP and SLMC parties accused the PA of election fraud and intimidation.

As was the case for most elections since 1983, few ballots were cast in LTTE-held parts of the country.

Results
The PA remained in office but had problems to form a majority.  The resulting deadlock led to the 2001 election.

By province

By electoral district

Elected members

Notes

References

 
 
 
 
 
 
 
 
 
 

 
Parliamentary elections in Sri Lanka
Sri Lanka
2000 in Sri Lanka
Sri Lanka